Women's 200m races for wheelchair athletes at the 2004 Summer Paralympics were held in the Athens Olympic Stadium. Events were held in two disability classes.

T52

The T52 event consisted of 2 heats and a final. It was won by Lisa Franks, representing .

1st Round

Heat 1
25 Sept. 2004, 18:45

Heat 2
25 Sept. 2004, 18:51

Final Round
26 Sept. 2004, 20:05

T54

The T54 event consisted of 3 heats and a final. It was won by Chantal Petitclerc, representing .

1st Round

Heat 1
26 Sept. 2004, 21:45

Heat 2
26 Sept. 2004, 21:51

Heat 3
26 Sept. 2004, 21:57

Final Round
27 Sept. 2004, 20:10

References

W
2004 in women's athletics